V is the fifth full-length album by San Francisco metal/indie group The Fucking Champs, released in 2002 on Drag City.

Track listing
Never Enough Neck Pt. 1
Never Enough Neck Pt. 2
Children Perceive The Hoax Cluster
I Am The Album Cover
Nebula Ball Rests In A Fantasy Claw
The Virtues Of Cruising
Aliens Of Gold
Air On A G-String
Hats Off To Music
Major Airbro's Landing
Policenauts 2000
Crummy Lovers Die In The Grave
Part Three
Happy Segovia
Chorale Motherfucker

2002 albums
Drag City (record label) albums